William Wayne "Cotton" Frazier Sr. (March 5, 1939 – March 11, 2012) was a professional American football center who played four seasons in the American Football League (AFL) from 1962 to 1967.

He started with the San Diego Chargers, was traded to the Houston Oilers, then to the Buffalo Bills, and finally to the Kansas City Chiefs in 1966. After winning the AFL championship with the Chiefs that year, he started for them in the first AFL-NFL World Championship Game. He later served as head coach at W. S. Neal High School in East Brewton and led the Eagles to a 23–17 record from 1980 to 1983.

William Wayne Frazier died March 11, 2012, aged 73, in Brewton, Alabama after an extended illness. He was buried at Brownville Memorial Cemetery in Evergreen, Alabama.

See also
Other American Football League players

References

External links

1939 births
2012 deaths
People from Evergreen, Alabama
People from Brewton, Alabama
American football centers
Auburn Tigers football players
Players of American football from Alabama
Houston Oilers players
Kansas City Chiefs players
San Diego Chargers players
Buffalo Bills players
American Football League players